Bill Sorrell can refer to:
Billy Sorrell (1940–2008), American baseball player
William Sorrell (born 1947), American attorney general